The Royal Institute of Philosophy, founded in 1925, is a charity organisation that offers lectures and conferences on philosophical topics. The Institute is "dedicated to the advancement of philosophy in all its forms, in order to access the widest possible audience.", and is not committed to any particular philosophical school, method or ideology.  The Institute’s membership includes both professional philosophers and lay people. It is based in London, but has several branch offices around the UK, including Glasgow, Wolverhampton, Durham, and Birmingham.

History
While waiting to go into prison for sponsoring an anti-war pamphlet in 1916, Bertrand Russell gave his Lectures on Logical Atomism in the hall where the Institute's annual lecture series are now held. He finished them just before he was incarcerated. The Home Secretary, Lord Balfour, gave the extraordinary instruction that the prisoner should be allowed writing materials in this cell, in which he produced his Introduction to Mathematical Philosophy, published in 1919. Russell, together with Balfour, L. T. Hobhouse, Samuel Alexander, Harold Laski, and the Institute's Journal's first editor, Sydney Hooper, founded the Institute, originally known as the British Institute of Philosophical Studies, in 1925.

The first President of the Institute was Lord Balfour, succeeded in 1930 by Lord Samuel, in 1959 by Lord Halsbury, in 1991 by Anthony Quinton, and in 2006 by Sir Anthony Kenny. Sir Anthony, the current President, has been  Master of Balliol College, Oxford and President of the British Academy. He is author of many philosophical books and articles, and he gave the Institute’s Annual Lecture in 2007. Sir David Ross was for many years Chairman of Council, and Professor Hywel Lewis for many years after him.  He was succeeded by the then Vice-Chancellor of the University of London,  Stewart Sutherland, Baron Sutherland of Houndwood.  After almost 20 years of service to the Institute, Lord Sutherland was succeeded by Professor Ted Honderich, Emeritus Grote Professor of Mind and Logic at University College London

Professor H. B. Acton, Director of the Institute while Professor at Bedford College, London, who is commemorated by occasional special lectures, was succeeded by Professor Godfrey Vesey, the founding Professor of Philosophy of the Open University. On his retirement after 13 years as Director he was appointed Fellow of the Institute in 1979. Professor Anthony O'Hear of the University of Bradford has been Director since the session 1994-95. The Institute's title of Royal was granted in 1947. The secretary to the society  was James Garvey.

Activities
 The publication of Philosophy
 The publication of Think
 The London Lecture Series
 The Annual Lecture
 The Institute’s Branch Scheme
 The Jacobsen Fellowships
 The Institute’s Bursaries
 Philosophy in Schools
 Conferences
 The Philosophy Archive Project 
 Supplemental volumes to Philosophy

References

External links
Official website

Philosophical societies in the United Kingdom
Organizations established in 1925
Learned societies of the United Kingdom
1925 establishments in the United Kingdom